Timothy Duane Hardaway Jr. (born March 16, 1992) is an American professional basketball player for the Dallas Mavericks of the National Basketball Association (NBA). He played college basketball for the Michigan Wolverines and declared for the NBA draft after his junior season for the national runner-up 2012–13 team. Hardaway was selected with the 24th overall pick in the 2013 NBA draft by the New York Knicks. He has had two stints with the Knicks and has also played for the Atlanta Hawks. He is the son of NBA Hall of Famer Tim Hardaway.

As a freshman during the 2010–11 NCAA Division I men's basketball season, he earned four Big Ten Conference Freshman of the Week awards, including three in the final four weeks during which he averaged over 20 points a game to help the 2010–11 team to climb up to fourth in the 2010–11 Big Ten Conference men's basketball season standings. He was an honorable mention All-Big Ten selection and a unanimous Big Ten All-Freshman team selection following the season. He established the Michigan freshman record for single-season three-point shots made. He was a 2011 Collegeinsider.com Freshmen All-America selection and participated as a member of Team USA in the 2011 FIBA Under-19 World Championship.  As a sophomore for the 2011–12 team, he earned the 2011–12 All-Big Ten 3rd team recognition. He earned 2012–13 All-Big Ten (1st team: coaches and 2nd team: media) recognition.

Early life
Hardaway is the son of Yolanda and former NBA All-Star Tim Hardaway. He was born in Alameda, California, while his father was a member of the Golden State Warriors.

High school career
Hardaway graduated from Miami Palmetto High School in the Pinecrest neighborhood of Miami-Dade County, Florida. As a freshman, he played high school football for a year before focusing on basketball. As he focused on basketball, he had a tumultuous relationship with his father, who acted like a second coach. His first college recruitment contact was by University of Michigan, communicating by mail during his second year. During his junior year, Michigan head coach John Beilein invited him on an unofficial visit to watch Michigan play No. 4 Duke on December 6 to see unranked Michigan pull an upset. The 81–73 victory was an important win for the program. Following his junior season, Hardaway began training with Ed Downs, with whom he would work every summer until he became an NBA draftee. In the summer before his senior season, he attended Beilein's Elite Camp in Ann Arbor, Michigan, receiving an offer that he accepted.  At the time, Hardaway was unranked in the Rivals.com Top-150 and his only other offers were from Minnesota and Kansas State. He was a first team All-City selection in 2009 and 2010 after being a third team selection in 2008.  During his 2009–10 senior season, he averaged 31.7 points, 7.3 rebounds and 4.0 assists. In the Florida state championships against Pine Crest School, he posted 42 points against Brandon Knight who had 36. ESPN rated him as the 93rd best player and 28th best shooting guard in the class of 2010. Scout.com rated him as the 36th best shooting guard in his class. He was not top-ranked by Rivals.com. Hardaway has played summer Amateur Athletic Union (AAU) basketball for both the South Florida Heat and Chicago's Mac Irvin Fire, where he teamed with  Meyers Leonard and McDonald's All-American Jereme Richmond.

College career

Freshman season (2010–2011) 
Hardaway joined the team that had just lost Manny Harris who had declared for the 2010 NBA draft, and he began his season in the starting lineup for the 2010–11 Wolverines on November 13 against . Although Hardaway led the team in scoring in his first career game and the season opener with 19 points, he was soon in a shooting slump that saw him shoot 4 for 30 on his field goals in late November games against Syracuse and UTEP. These games marked the beginning of a slump during which he went 13 consecutive games without achieving a 50% field goal percentage and 19 games without exceeding that number.

Hardaway earned four Big Ten Freshman of the week awards.  On December 27, the Big Ten Conference named Hardaway co-freshman of the week along with Jared Sullinger. On December 23, 2010, against , the team tied its December 13, 2008, single-game school record of 16 three-point field goals made, and Hardaway was one of three Wolverines to make 4 three-point shots. It was Hardaway's first 20-point game. On February 14, Hardaway earned his second Big Ten Conference Freshman of the week recognition for his first career double-double on February 9 against Northwestern (17 points and career-high 10 rebounds) and a career-high 26 points on February 12 against Indiana. The following week, Hardaway earned a third Big Ten Conference Freshman of the week award as he became the first Michigan freshman to score thirty points in a game in eight years. His thirty points came in a 75–72 February 19 overtime victory over Iowa. He had also scored 10 points and added 5 assists in a 54–52 loss to Illinois. On February 28, Hardaway earned his third consecutive and fourth overall Big Ten Conference Freshman of the week recognition. During the week, Hardaway extended his double-digit scoring streak to eleven by posting 22 points against Minnesota on February 26 after scoring 16 against No. 12 Wisconsin on February 23. For the week, he shot 9 for 15 on his three-point shots.

As a result of the three consecutive freshman of the week performances and a final week in which he scored 20 in the team's only game, he averaged 20.1 points during the final 7 games of the regular season while the team won six of its final eight, which enabled it to finish tied for fourth for the conference standings and earn the fourth seed in the 2011 Big Ten Conference men's basketball tournament. He led the team in scoring during the 18-game conference schedule of the 2010–11 Big Ten Conference men's basketball season, edging out teammate Darius Morris by a 268–263 (14.9–14.6 points per game) margin. He also led the team in steals (1.17/game), free throw percentage (71.2%, min 2.0 made/game), three-point shooting percentage (44.2%, min 1.0 made/game), and three-point shots made per game (2.56) over the course of the conference schedule. Following the Big Ten Conference season, Hardaway was an honorable mention All-Big Ten selection by both the coaches and the media.  Hardaway was also one of two unanimous All-Freshman team selections by the coaches. He was one of 21 players selected to the 2011 Collegeinsider.com Freshmen All-America selection.

In the semi-finals of the 2011 Big Ten tournament against Ohio State, he set the Michigan freshman single-season three-point shots made record of 74. For the season, Hardaway led the team in three-point shots made per game and free throw percentage (among qualifying players). He finished the season with 16 consecutive double digit scoring efforts.

Following the season he was invited to the June 17–24, 2011 17-man tryouts for the 12-man FIBA Under-19 World Championship team by USA Basketball. The 12 selected players competed as Team USA in the 2011 FIBA U19 World Championships in Latvia from June 30 – July 10, 2011. He was selected to the team.

Sophomore season (2011–2012) 

As a sophomore, he was a preseason top 50 watchlist selection for the John R. Wooden Award and the Naismith College Player of the Year. In the 3-game November 21–23 2011 Maui Invitational Tournament, Hardaway scored 60 points against the No. 8 Memphis Tigers, No. 6 Duke Blue Devils, and 2011–12 Pac-12 season favorite UCLA Bruins, which helped the team finish in third place and earned him a place on the All-Tournament team. For his performance at the Maui Classic, he earned the Big Ten Player of the Week. In addition, he was named Big Ten Player of the Week by College Sports Madness. In the subsequent game, he picked up two fouls against Virginia in the first 5:33 and sat the final 14:27 of the first half. He finished the November 29 contest with just 5 points, snapping a 22-game double-digit scoring streak. On December 29, he opened the 2011–12 Big Ten Conference men's basketball season with 26 points against Penn State, despite making only 1 of 7 three-point shots. On January 8, 2012, he had his second career double-double with 17 points and 10 rebounds against 19th ranked Wisconsin. By early February, he was in a deep shooting slump. He posted his second double-double of the season and third of his career on March 1 against Illinois with 25 points and a career-high 11 rebounds. As a sophomore, he earned the 2011–12 All-Big Ten 3rd team recognition by the coaches and media. The team earned a share of the 2011–12 Big Ten Conference season regular season championship.

Junior season (2012–2013) 

CBS Sports listed him as the 35th best player in its preseason top 100. He was a preseason John R. Wooden Award top 50 selection. During the season, Trey Burke and Hardaway were constantly referred to as the best backcourt in college basketball. The praise came from a variety of leading media outlets such as FOX Sports, ESPN color commentator Dick Vitale, ESPN journalists such as Miles Simon, Bleacher Report columnist Zach Dirlam (who included backcourt depth provided by Nik Stauskas), as well as much local press.

Hardaway began the season with a double-double by scoring 25 points (including 5-for-5 three-point shooting) and adding 10 rebounds. His fourth career double-double earned him his second Big Ten Player of the Week award. Hardaway earned the NIT Season Tip-Off MVP with 39 points total in the November 21 semi-final and November 23 final against Pittsburgh and Kansas State, respectively. On December 20, he posted a career-high 7 assists against Eastern Michigan. Hardaway suffered an ankle injury that caused him to miss the December 29 game against Central Michigan and that broke his 81 consecutive games played streak that went back to the beginning of his Michigan career. In the subsequent game on January 3, he returned to the lineup for the 2012–13 Big Ten Conference men's basketball season opener against Northwestern with 21 points and four assists in a 94–66 victory. Two games later on January 9, he tied a career high with 11 rebounds and added 15 points for his fifth career double-double. On January 17, Michigan defeated Minnesota (#9 AP/#12 Coaches) at Williams Arena, marking the first time Michigan defeated a top-10 team on the road since a December 6, 1996, victory by the 1996–97 team over Duke. Hardaway earned a second Big Ten Player of the Week Award following a 21-points performance on 7-for-8 shooting (4-for-5 three-point shot) with 5 rebounds, 3 assists, 3 steals and 2 blocks. On January 28, Michigan was ranked number one in the AP Poll with 51 of the 65 first place votes. It marked the first time Michigan ranked atop the AP Poll since the Fab Five 1992–93 team did so on December 5, 1992. On February 5, Hardaway tallied a career high 6 three-point shots, including three on consecutive possessions to give Michigan its first lead of the second half in an overtime victory against Ohio State.

Prior to the 2013 NCAA Men's Division I Basketball Tournament, Jeff Goodman of CBSSports.com named Michigan with Hardaway first among tournament teams in terms of having the most future NBA talent on its roster (in the absence of Kentucky who was relegated to the 2013 National Invitation Tournament). As a number four seed, Michigan defeated its first NCAA tournament opponent, South Dakota State, 71–56. Hardaway established a new NCAA tournament career-high with 21 points. The 27th victory of the season gave the team its most wins in 20 years and matched head coach John Beilein's career high. In the regional finals on March 31 against Florida, freshman Nik Stauskas made all 6 of his three-point shot attempts, pushing his single-season total to 79 and surpassing Hardaway's single-season freshman school record. Following the regional championship postgame prayer and with Mrs. Beilein's consent, Hardaway and Mitch McGary gave
head coach John Beilein a gatorade shower. In the April 6 national semi-final against Syracuse, Hardaway contributed a team-high 13 points, 6 rebounds and 5 assists. Two nights later, Michigan lost in the championship game to Louisville by an 82–76 margin as Hardaway contributed 12 points, 5 rebounds and 4 assists.

On April 17, Hardaway declared for the NBA draft. Hardaway signed with sports agent Mark Bartelstein, the father of a former Michigan teammate, who represents 37 NBA players. Hardaway was one of 60 players invited to the NBA draft Combine.

Honors and awards

Following the 2012–13 Big Ten season he was a 1st team All-Big Ten selection by the coaches and a 2nd team selection by the media. On March 12, the U.S. Basketball Writers Association named Hardaway to its 2012–13 Men's All-District V (OH, IN, IL, MI, MN, WI) Team, based upon voting from its national membership. He was named to the National Association of Basketball Coaches Division I All‐District 7 first team on March 26, as selected and voted on by member coaches of the NABC, making him eligible for the State Farm Coaches’ Division I All-America team.

Professional career

New York Knicks (2013–2015) 

Hardaway was drafted 24th overall by the New York Knicks. Trey Burke and Hardaway became the first Michigan duo selected in the first round since Juwan Howard and Jalen Rose in the 1994 NBA draft. Hardaway joined his father (14th in 1989 NBA draft) as a first round selection.

On July 8, the Knicks announced that Hardaway signed a 4-year, $6.1 million contract, clearing the way for him to play in the 2013 NBA Summer League. In the second game of the summer league, on July 14, he suffered a bruised wrist. Hardaway's Summer League season ended as a result of the mishap, although the injury only had a short-term impact.

Hardaway made his regular season debut in the 2013–14 Knicks season opener on October 30, at home against Milwaukee, with 5 points on a 2–2 shooting night and 2 assists, during 15 minutes of playing time. In his second game, on October 31 against the Chicago Bulls, he played 27 minutes, totalling 10 points and 3 rebounds. After Smith returned to the lineup, Hardaway scored 11 points against the San Antonio Spurs on November 10 and 14 points against the Atlanta Hawks on November 13, for sequential career highs. He posted his first 3-assist game on November 16 in another contest against the Hawks. On December 1 against the New Orleans Pelicans, Hardaway had a career-high 21 points. When Kenyon Martin sat out against the
Boston Celtics on December 8, Hardaway earned his first NBA start. With Carmelo Anthony and Raymond Felton sitting out the Christmas Day game against the Oklahoma City Thunder, Hardaway matched his career high with 21 points. On January 29, he was named a Rising Stars Challenge participant as part of the 2014 NBA All-Star Game weekend. The following night Hardaway set a career high with a game high (tied with Carmelo Anthony) 29 points against the Cleveland Cavaliers. Hardaway finished fifth in the NBA Rookie of the Year Award balloting. He was also a first-team NBA All-Rookie Team selection.

Hardaway committed to represent the Knicks in 2014 NBA Summer League. In five summer league games, he averaged 22.8 points per game, which was second in the league. He earned NBA All-Summer League second team recognition.

On January 24, 2015, Hardaway posted a season-high 25 points along with 6 rebounds and 5 assists against the Charlotte Hornets. After playing two minutes against the Phoenix Suns, Hardaway injured his wrist on March 15. He then missed the next 9 games before returning to the lineup on April 3 against the Washington Wizards. He again posted 25 points in the season finale on April 15 against Detroit.

Atlanta Hawks (2015–2017)

On June 25, 2015, Hardaway was traded to the Atlanta Hawks in exchange for the draft rights to Jerian Grant. Hardaway did not debut with the Hawks until November 24 against the Boston Celtics in the team's 16th game.

On December 3, 2015, using the flexible assignment rule, the Hawks assigned Hardaway to the Canton Charge, the D-League affiliate of the Cleveland Cavaliers. He was recalled by the Hawks three days later. On December 28, again using the flexible assignment rule, he was assigned this time to the Austin Spurs, the affiliate of the San Antonio Spurs. On January 3, 2016, he was recalled by the Hawks. Two days later, he played in his first game for the Hawks since November 28, scoring three points in 12 minutes off the bench in a 107–101 loss to the New York Knicks.

Hardaway made his first start for Atlanta on March 17, 2016, against the Denver Nuggets. He posted a season-high 21 points, seven rebounds, four assists, a steal and no turnovers in a season-high 29 minutes, far surpassing his February 3 season best of 13 points against Philadelphia 76ers.

In the Hawks' season opener on October 27, 2016, Hardaway scored 21 points off the bench in a 114–99 win over the Washington Wizards. 12 of his points came in the final quarter as the Hawks extended their 1-point lead. On January 1, 2017, he matched his career high with 29 points, including a tying three-pointer with 3.3 seconds remaining in regulation, nine points in overtime and the go-ahead free throw with 10.8 seconds remaining in overtime, to help the Hawks defeat the San Antonio Spurs 114–112. On February 2, Hardaway contributed 23 of his career-high 33 points in the fourth quarter, as he helped his team rally from as many as 20 points down against the Houston Rockets to win the contest. On March 3, he made five of nine three-pointers and scored a career-high 36 points in a 135–130 loss to the Cleveland Cavaliers. Hardaway had a career-high 9 rebounds to go along with 21 points on April 9 against Cleveland as part of a week in which Hardaway averaged 22 points in a 3–0 week for the Hawks.

Return to New York (2017–2019)

Following the 2016–17 season, the Hawks extended Hardaway a qualifying offer, making him a restricted free agent. On July 6, 2017, Hardaway received a four-year, $71 million offer sheet from the Knicks; Atlanta had 48 hours to match the offer or lose Hardaway. The contract of $16.50M, $17.32M, $18.15M and $18.97M contained a player option in year 4 and included a 15% bonus of outstanding year 1 through 3 salary in the event of a trade. The Hawks declined to match the offer, and Hardaway signed with the Knicks on July 8.

On November 8, with Kristaps Porziņģis sidelined, Hardaway posted his first NBA career double-double with a game-high 26 points and 11 rebounds against the Orlando Magic. On November 22, Hardaway scored a then-career-high 38 points in a 108–100 victory over the Toronto Raptors. On December 5, he was ruled out for at least two weeks with a stress injury to his left leg. On January 12, he returned for the Knicks after missing 20 games. He scored 16 points in 25 minutes off the bench in a 118–108 loss to the Minnesota Timberwolves. On March 23, he scored a career-high 39 points in a 108–104 loss to the Timberwolves.

In the Knicks' season opener on October 17, 2018, Hardaway scored 31 points in a 126–107 win over the Atlanta Hawks. The Knicks had a franchise-record, 49-point second quarter behind Hardaway's 16-point quarter. On October 29, he scored 25 points and tied a career high with eight assists in a 115–96 win over the Brooklyn Nets. On October 31, he scored 37 points, including career highs of 7 three-point field goals and 10 field goals, in a 107–101 loss to the Indiana Pacers.

Dallas Mavericks (2019–present)
On January 31, 2019, Hardaway was traded, along with Trey Burke, Courtney Lee and Kristaps Porziņģis, to the Dallas Mavericks in exchange for DeAndre Jordan, Wesley Matthews, Dennis Smith Jr. and two future first-round draft picks. After averaging 15.5 points in 19 games for the Mavericks, he was sidelined for the final 11 games with a lower leg stress fracture that required surgery.

On November 20, 2019, Hardaway was inserted into the starting lineup for the first time that season, scoring 20 points in a 142–94 win against the Golden State Warriors. On December 8, 2019, he made a career high 9 three pointers in a 110–106 loss to the Sacramento Kings. Hardaway finished the regular season with a career high 204 three pointers made, 7th most in the NBA.

On November 19, 2020, after the conclusion of the 2019–20 season, Hardaway exercised his contractual option to remain with the Mavericks. After the 2020–21 NBA season, Hardaway finished 5th in voting for the NBA Sixth Man of the Year Award, one spot behind teammate Jalen Brunson.

Hardaway re-signed with the Mavericks on August 9, 2021. On February 1, 2022, he underwent left foot surgery for his fifth metatarsal bone and was ruled out indefinitely.

National team career 
On July 18, 2014, Hardaway was named to practice with the USA Basketball National Select Team from July 28–31.

Career statistics

NBA

Regular season

|-
| style="text-align:left;"| 
| style="text-align:left;"| New York
| 81 || 1 || 23.1 || .428 || .363 || .828 || 1.5 || .8 || .5 || .1 || 10.2
|-
| style="text-align:left;"| 
| style="text-align:left;"| New York
| 70 || 30 || 24.0 || .389 || .342 || .801 || 2.2 || 1.8 || .3 || .2 || 11.5
|-
| style="text-align:left;"| 
| style="text-align:left;"| Atlanta
| 51 || 1 || 16.9 || .430 || .338 || .893 || 1.7 || 1.0 || .4 || .1 || 6.4
|-
| style="text-align:left;"| 
| style="text-align:left;"| Atlanta
| 79 || 30 || 27.3 || .455 || .357 || .766 || 2.8 || 2.3 || .7 || .2 || 14.5
|-
| style="text-align:left;"| 
| style="text-align:left;"| New York
| 57 || 54 || 33.1 || .421 || .317 || .816 || 3.9 || 2.7 || 1.1 || .2 || 17.5
|-
| style="text-align:left;" rowspan=2|
| style="text-align:left;"| New York
| 46 || 46 || 32.6 || .388 || .347 || .854 || 3.5 || 2.7 || .9 || .1 || 19.1
|-
| style="text-align:left;"| Dallas
| 19 || 17 || 29.4 || .404 || .321 || .767 || 3.2 || 1.9 || .6 || .1 || 15.5
|-
| style="text-align:left;"| 
| style="text-align:left;"| Dallas
| 71 || 58 || 29.5 || .434 || .398 || .819 || 3.3 || 1.9 || .6 || .1 || 15.8
|-
| style="text-align:left;"| 
| style="text-align:left;"| Dallas
| 70 || 31 || 28.4 || .447 || .391 || .816 || 3.3 || 1.8 || .4 || .2 || 16.6
|-
| style="text-align:left;"| 
| style="text-align:left;"| Dallas
| 42 || 20 || 29.6 || .394 || .336 || .757 || 3.7 || 2.2 || .9 || .1 || 14.2
|- class="sortbottom"
| style="text-align:center;" colspan="2"| Career
| 586 || 288 || 27.0 || .422 || .358 || .812 || 2.8 || 1.9 || .6 || .1 || 13.9

Playoffs

|-
| style="text-align:left;"| 
| style="text-align:left;"| Atlanta
| 9 || 0 || 9.7 || .269 || .143 || .667 || 1.0 || .8 || .0 || .1 || 2.2
|-
| style="text-align:left;"| 
| style="text-align:left;"| Atlanta
| 6 || 6 || 33.3 || .329 || .262 || .632 || 2.7 || 1.2 || .5 || .0 || 12.8
|-
| style="text-align:left;"| 
| style="text-align:left;"| Dallas
| 6 || 6 || 34.0 || .421 || .352 || .727 || 3.5 || 1.8 || .3 || .0 || 17.8
|-
| style="text-align:left;"| 
| style="text-align:left;"| Dallas
| 7 || 7 || 37.4 || .416 || .404 || .750 || 3.3 || 1.4 || .4 || .0 || 17.0
|- class="sortbottom"
| style="text-align:center;" colspan="2"| Career
| 28 || 19 || 26.9 || .382 || .329 || .692 || 2.5 || 1.3 || .3 || .0 || 11.5

College

|-
| style="text-align:left;"| 2010–11
| style="text-align:left;"| Michigan
| 35 || 35 || 30.7 || .420 || .367 || .765 || 3.8 || 1.7 || 1.0 || .1 || 13.9
|-
| style="text-align:left;"| 2011–12
| style="text-align:left;"| Michigan
| 34 || 34 || 34.2 || .418 || .283 || .715 || 3.8 || 2.1 || .5 || .3 || 14.6
|-
| style="text-align:left;"| 2012–13
| style="text-align:left;"| Michigan
| 38 || 38 || 34.8 || .437 || .374 || .694 || 4.7 || 2.4 || .7 || .4 || 14.5
|- class="sortbottom"
| style="text-align:center;" colspan="2"| Career
| 107 || 107 || 33.3 || .425 || .343 || .724 || 4.1 || 2.1 || .7 || .3 || 14.3

Personal life
He has a sister named Nia, and is the son of five-time NBA All-Star Tim Hardaway. During the 2012–13 season, Hardaway memorialized deceased friends on his left shoe and deceased family members on his right shoe.

See also

List of second-generation National Basketball Association players

References

External links

Hardaway stats at ESPN
Hardaway archive at ESPN
Michigan Wolverines bio
Hardaway's FIBA U19 profile

1992 births
Living people
African-American basketball players
American men's basketball players
Atlanta Hawks players
Austin Spurs players
Basketball players from Miami
Canton Charge players
Dallas Mavericks players
Michigan Wolverines men's basketball players
New York Knicks draft picks
New York Knicks players
Shooting guards
21st-century African-American sportspeople